The 2017 Laver Cup was the first edition of the Laver Cup, a men's tennis tournament between teams from Europe and the rest of the world. It was held on indoor hard courts at the O2 Arena in Prague, Czech Republic from 22 until 24 September.

Team Europe won the inaugural tournament 15–9.

Player selection
On 24 August 2016, Roger Federer and Rafael Nadal were the first of six players to confirm their participation for Team Europe. On 15 May 2017, more than eight months later, Milos Raonic was the first of six players to confirm his participation for Team World. By 24 August 2017, all six players from each team had been chosen: Roger Federer, Rafael Nadal, Alexander Zverev, Marin Čilić, Dominic Thiem, and Tomáš Berdych for Team Europe, and Milos Raonic, John Isner, Jack Sock, Sam Querrey, Juan Martín del Potro, and Denis Shapovalov for Team World. Shortly afterwards Raonic withdrew and was replaced by Nick Kyrgios. Later Frances Tiafoe took the place of del Potro who had also withdrawn.

Former rivals Björn Borg of Sweden (Europe) and John McEnroe of the United States (World) were serving as captains for the 2017 edition.

Prize money 
The total prize money for 2017 Laver Cup is set at $2,250,000 for all 12 participating players.

Each winning team member will pocket $250,000 in the inaugural edition of the Laver Cup.

Whereas, each of the losing team members will earn $125,000 each.

Participants

Matches 
Each match win on day 1 was worth one point, on day 2 two points, and on day 3 three points. The first team to 13 points won. Since four matches were played each day, there were a total of 24 points available. However, since 12 of the total points are earned on day 3, neither team could win prior to the final day of play.

Player statistics

References

External links

2017
2017 in tennis
Tennis tournaments in the Czech Republic
2017 in Czech tennis
Sports competitions in Prague
2010s in Prague
September 2017 sports events in Europe